The SSA Women's Football League is the top division of women's football league in the Indian state of Meghalaya. The league is organised by the Shillong Sports Association (SSA), which is affiliated to the Meghalaya Football Association (MFA), the official football governing body of the state.

The inaugural season was held in 2021 and was won by Mawlai SC.

Venue
The matches are held at MFA Turf, Polo Ground. Shillong.

Clubs

2021–22 season
The teams participating in the 2021–22 season:

Champions

References

Women's football leagues in India
Football in Meghalaya
Football leagues in India
2021 establishments in Meghalaya
Sports leagues established in 2021
Shillong